The Linwood Mausoleum is a massive limestone structure in Linwood Cemetery, Paragould, Arkansas.  Occupying the highest ground in the cemetery, it is a rectangular single-story Classical Revival limestone structure, with stained-glass windows.  Its interior walls are finished with gray-veined white marble.  The entry is sheltered by a portico with Doric columns.  The mausoleum houses 170 crypts.  Built in 1920 by a group of private citizens, it was later conveyed to the city, and is (as of 2007) Arkansas' only known city-owned mausoleum.  It is also architecturally distinctive in the region for its heavy limestone construction and Classical Revival features.

The building was listed on the National Register of Historic Places in 2007.

See also
Mount Holly Mausoleum: NRHP listing in Little Rock, Arkansas
National Register of Historic Places listings in Greene County, Arkansas

References

Neoclassical architecture in Arkansas
Buildings and structures completed in 1920
Buildings and structures in Paragould, Arkansas
National Register of Historic Places in Greene County, Arkansas
Mausoleums on the National Register of Historic Places
Monuments and memorials on the National Register of Historic Places in Arkansas
1920 establishments in Arkansas
Death in Arkansas